Fritillaria purdyi, the Purdy's fritillary, is a rare species of flowering plant in the lily family Liliaceae.

It is endemic to northwestern California, USA, from San Francisco Bay north, where it grows in the serpentine soils of the coastal and inland California Coast Ranges.

Description
Fritillaria purdyi is a bulb-forming herbaceous perennial with an erect stem 10 to 40 centimeters tall. The leaves are ovate, up to 10 centimeters long.

The smooth stem is topped with a raceme inflorescence of one or more cup- or bell-shaped flowers. Each flower has 6 white tepals heavily shaded with brownish-purple streaks or marks and pink tinting.

References

External links
  Calflora Database: Fritillaria purdyi (Purdy's fritillary)
 Jepson eFlora (TJM2): Fritillaria purdyi
USDA Plants Profile for Fritillaria purdyi
UC Photos gallery of Fritillaria purdyi

purdyi
Endemic flora of California
Flora of the Klamath Mountains
Natural history of the California chaparral and woodlands
Natural history of the California Coast Ranges
Plants described in 1902
Taxa named by Alice Eastwood
Flora without expected TNC conservation status